Willem Godschalck van Focquenbroch (1640 – June 1670) was a Dutch poet and playwright. Aside from satirical and burlesque plays and poetry, he also wrote more serious works in a Petrarchic tradition. Whereas there was little attention for Focquenbroch in the nineteenth century, interest in him renewed in the twentieth century.

Biography
Willem Godschalck van Focquenbroch was born in Amsterdam to Paulus van Focquenbroch, a merchant originally from Antwerp, and Catharina Sweers, the daughter of an Antwerp carpenter. He was baptised on 26 April 1640 in the Oude Kerk in Amsterdam.

Focquenbroch studied medicine at the Athenaeum Illustre of Amsterdam. He studied theology with professor Hoornbeek at Leiden University between about 1658 and 1661. His studies in Leiden were sponsored by the Walloon Church. He promoted in 1662 at Utrecht University on research on sexually transmitted diseases. He then worked in Amsterdam as a doctor for the poor. He wrote his first play, "" in 1663. In 1668 however, Focquenbroch applied for a job at the Dutch West India Company. He was designated fiscal on the Dutch Gold Coast. On 17 July 1668, Focquenbroch left for Africa. Two years later, in June 1670, Focquenbroch succumbed to a disease epidemic on the coast.

Works
 "De verwarde jalousy, Blyspel". Amsterdam: Jacob Lescaille, 1663.
 "Klucht van de weyery". Amsterdam: Jacob Vinckel, 1665.
 "Klucht van Hans Keyenvresser". Amsterdam: Jacob Vinckel, 1665.
 "Thalia, of geurige sanggoddin". Amsterdam: Johannes van den Bergh, 1665.
 "Een Hollandsche vuystslagh, op een Brabandsche koon". Z.pl. [1665].
 "Verdubbelt zegensangh, der negen musen". Amsterdam: Johannes van den Bergh, 1666.
 "De herderssangen van Virgilius Maro". Amsterdam: Johannes van den Bergh, 1666.
 "Thalia, of geurige zanggoddin, tweede deel". Amsterdam: Johannes van den Bergh, 1668/1669.
 "Min in't lazarushuys, Blyspel". Amsterdam: Jacob Vinckel, 1674.
 "Afrikaense Thalia, of het derde deel van de geurige zanggodin". Amsterdam: Jan ten Hoorn, 1678.

References

External links
  DBNL profile of Van Focquenbroch
  Website about Van Focquenbroch by Jan Helwig

1640 births
1670 deaths
17th-century Dutch dramatists and playwrights
17th-century Dutch physicians
17th-century Dutch poets
17th-century male writers
Dutch Gold Coast people
Dutch male poets
Dutch male dramatists and playwrights
Sailors on ships of the Dutch West India Company
Utrecht University alumni
Writers from Amsterdam